Vivacom is the largest telecommunications company in Bulgaria and a former state-owned incumbent operator. The company is headquartered in the capital city Sofia and employs around 5,900 people, owning a mature distribution network with around 230 branded retail outlets and alternative sale points.

Vivacom is a fully integrated operator, providing mobile, fixed voice, fixed broadband and pay-TV (both DTH and IPTV) services on a nationwide scale to both residential and business customers. The fixed-line services are provided through copper-based and fibre network footprint, while the mobile services are based on GSM/GPRS/EDGE and UMTS/HSPA+/LTE technologies.

Vivacom owns and operates Plana Teleport, which is able to deliver transmission and connectivity even to the most remote points, including orbital positions in Europe, Africa, Middle East and Asia. Since 2014, Plana Teleport is a member of the World Teleport Association and in 2017 achieved full Tier 3 certification, making it among the most modern facilities of its kind.

History 
BTC has its roots as the incumbent fixed-line operator organizing and facilitating communications services in Bulgaria. The company has gone through various stages of operation – from the long period of state-owned structure to the privatization procedure in 2004, when the Bulgarian government sold 65% of the share capital.

In May 2005 the BTC was granted a license for the development of third-generation mobile telecommunication systems under the UMTS standard. In November 2005 the company launched its mobile services under the “Vivatel” brand. Vivatel became Bulgaria's fastest growing mobile operator following its launch.

In January 2009, BTC announced the merger with its subsidiary BTC Mobile (Vivatel).

In September 2009, BTC and Vivatel united into a new brand - Vivacom. Nowadays, Vivacom is the operator that offers the widest range of telecommunication solutions on the Bulgarian market.

In late 2012, VTB Capital, the investment arm of Russia's second-largest bank, led a consortium (Viva Telecom Bulgaria EAD) to buy a controlling stake in BTC. The consortium included a local partner, Tzvetan Vassilev. In November 2012, Viva Telecom Bulgaria EAD acquired a 93.99 percent stake in the Bulgarian Telecommunications Company. The transaction became a fact as a result of the approval of a comprehensive scheme for the sale and restructuring of the company. The deal received approval from the European Commission and other regulatory authorities. Local experts state that the purchase of VIVACOM was among the most complicated deals in Bulgaria.

In 2015, the Belgian investor Pierre Louvrier made the acquisition of the Vivacom group via his Luxembourg holding company LIC33 for nearly 900 million euros. The acquisition was finally canceled by the Belgian investor in July 2015 following numerous embezzlements discovered by him, during the takeover of the Bulgarian group.

On 7 November 2019, it was announced that United Group, the leading telecoms, and media business operating in South-Eastern Europe, had agreed to acquire Viva Telecom Bulgaria. The deal was finalized on 31 July 2020 when the shares in Viva Telecom Bulgaria were acquired by United Group Bulgaria EOOD.

As of 30 September 2022, after 30 years of using the BTC name, the entity got rebranded from Bulgarian Telecommunication Company EAD to Vivacom Bulgaria EAD.

Operations

Mobile service 
As of December 31, 2019, Vivacom is the third largest mobile operator in Bulgaria, based on the number of subscribers. The company's mobile service revenue market share is approximately 30% for the year ended December 31, 2019.

As the end of 2019, Vivacom's mobile network has the following coverage of the Bulgarian population:
 2G (GSM/GRPS/EDGE) - 99.99%
 3G (UMTS/HSPA+) - 99.98%
 4G (LTE) - 99.94%
 5G network - VIVACOM launched the first Bulgaria 5G network in all 27 district centers of the country in September 2020.

VIVACOM has received the award for the fastest mobile network in Europe for the Q1-Q2 2020 period according to results from tests taken with Speedtest® by Ookla® for Q1-Q2 2020.

Fixed-line services 
Vivacom is the incumbent in the fixed voice market with 81% revenue share as at June 30, 2019. As of December 31, 2019 Vivacom is the largest fixed broadband operator with 27% subscriber market share. As of the end of 2019, Vivacom is positioned as the third largest pay-TV provider and the largest IPTV operator.

Television services 
On 1 March 2012 the TV channel of the company Vivacom Arena was launched. It is broadcast as a paid package in the operator's satellite and IPTV network. It broadcasts films, and in the first year of its broadcast, it also broadcast live tennis tournaments from the ATP World Tour 250 series.

Supervisory board 
 Dragan Šolak - Member of the Supervisory Board
 Victoriya Boklag - Member of the Supervisory Board
 Nikos Stathopoulos - Member of the Supervisory Board
 Stelios Elia - Member of the Supervisory Board

Management board 
 Atanas Dobrev - Member of the Managing Board, Chief Executive Officer
 Radoslav Zlatkov - Member of the Managing Board, Chief Technical Officer
 Dimitris Lioupis - Member of the Managing Board, Chief Commercial Officer
 Asen Velikov - Member of the Managing Board, Chief Financial Officer

References

 "Empreno Ventures". Empreno Ventures (in Russian). Retrieved 2019-11-25.
 Fildes, Nick. "Financial Times". The Financial Times.
 https://www.vivacom.bg/en/about/about-us/company/management#supervisory-board
 
 "UPDATE 1-Bulgarian telecoms firm Vivacom expects indicative offers by end-July". Reuters. 2019-07-12. Retrieved 2019-10-01.

External links 
 Official website (in Bulgarian)
 Official website (in English)

Telecommunications companies of Bulgaria
American International Group